Princess Sofya Aleksandrovna Urusova (April 6, 1804 – July 17, 1889) was a Russian lady-in-waiting and the favorite of Nicholas I.

Biography 
By birth member of an old House of Urusov, Sofya Alexandrovna was born in Moscow, as the daughter of Ober-Hofmeister Prince Alexander Mikhailovich Urusov (1766–1853) and his wife, Ekaterina Petrovna Tatishcheva (1775–1855), who was the sister of diplomat Dmitry Pavlovich Tatishchev.

She served as maid of honour to the empress between 1827 and 1833, and was the reputed lover of the emperor during that period. 

In 1833 she married prince Leon Hieronim Radziwiłł.

References 

Ladies-in-waiting from the Russian Empire
1804 births
1889 deaths
Russian royal favourites